Kamla Persad-Bissessar  (born Kamla Susheila Persad, 22 April 1952), often referred to by her initials  KPB, is a Trinidadian and Tobagonian lawyer, politician and educator who is the Leader of the Opposition of Trinidad and Tobago, political leader of the United National Congress (UNC) political party,  and was the sixth Prime Minister of Trinidad and Tobago from 26 May 2010 until 9 September 2015. She was the country's first female Prime Minister, Attorney General, and Leader of the Opposition, the first woman to chair the Commonwealth of Nations and the first woman of Indian origin to be a prime minister of a country outside of India and the wider South Asian region.

Persad-Bissessar became political leader of the UNC in 2010. In 2011, Persad-Bissessar was named the thirteenth most influential female leader around the world by Time magazine.

Persad-Bissessar held the premiership from May 2010 to September 2015, where she was also the leader of the People's Partnership - a political coalition of centre and center-left wing parties that governed the country. Since September 2015, she has been the Leader of the Opposition of Trinidad and Tobago. After the coalition disbanded in September 2015, following their electoral defeat, Persad-Bissessar attempted to regain power in the August 2020 elections; however, the UNC only managed to increase their seat count by 2 and the popular vote by 20,000. Nonetheless, the PNM under the leadership of Keith Rowley  (who later became Trinidad and Tobago's seventh Prime Minister) maintained power and was re-elected, however, with a smaller majority.

Early life and ancestry 
Kamla Susheila Persad was born in Siparia in southern Trinidad to Lilraj and Rita Persad, both Hindus of Indian descent. Her father was a bookkeeper and worked in the accounting department of Texaco, while her mother was a maid and labourer in the cocoa fields, who eventually saved up to own and operate a roti shop. Her paternal grandparents were Soomintra Persad (née Gopaulsingh) and Choranji Persad, and her maternal grandparents were Rookmin and Ramprit. Her paternal grandmother, Soomintra, was a market seller who was a founding member of the Saraswati Prakash Mandir, a Hindu temple at Boodoo Trace in Penal, and she had organized a ladies Indian singing and Hindu prayer group, as well as being an elder counsellor who helped those in need. Her maternal grandmother, Rookmin, and her maternal great-grandmother, Sumaria, were both laborers in the sugarcane and cocoa fields and both had to become the breadwinners to support their families after their husbands died at young ages. Persad-Bissessar has said that she credits her mother, grandmothers, and great-grandmother as setting examples for her in feminism and paving the way for her. Persad-Bissessar has one brother and three sisters, her brother and eldest sister are deceased and her other two sisters are Vidwatie and Sally.

She was born into a Brahmin Hindu Indian family. Her ancestors emigrated in the 1880s from India to Trinidad through the Indian indenture system. Her maternal great-grandparents (her maternal grandmother's parents) were Sumaria and Seepersad who were from India. Sumaria was from present-day Chennai, Tamil Nadu, India and had left India from the Madras Port. Her paternal great-grandparents (her paternal grandfather's parents) were Pundit Ram Lakhan Mishra and Ganga Mishra who were from India. Pundit Ram Lakhan Mishra was from Bhelupur, Bihar, India. After indentureship, Pundit Ram Lakhan and Ganga Mishra had settled at Boodoo Trace in the town of Penal in southern Trinidad. In 2012, Persad-Bissessar visited her paternal great-grandfather's village on a state visit to India.

Persad-Bissessar spent her early childhood living in a joint family with her parents and paternal grandparents at Boodoo Trace in Penal, where she attended the Mohess Road Hindu School. In 1959, at the age of seven, her family moved to Siparia where she attended the Erin Road Presbyterian Primary School, and later the Siparia Union Presbyterian Primary School. In 1963, she was accepted to Iere High School in Siparia, a new co-ed school at the time. There she was a top debating student, champion badminton and netball player, and she excelled in her classes and was put into special classes to write the GCE O Levels in 1966. She graduated in 1969.

When Persad-Bissessar was sixteen, she wanted to go to the United Kingdom to further her studies, but her traditional father and uncles insisted she stayed in Trinidad and Tobago. However, her mother eventually convinced them to send her. Persad-Bissessar then left Trinidad at the age of seventeen, in August 1969, to attended Norwood Technical College in West Norwood, London, England. While in college in England, she worked as a social worker with the Church of England's Children's Society of London.

By the time she left Trinidad she had already met her future husband Gregory Bisessar and he was already in England when she was attending college. They married two years later in 1971, when she was eighteen and he was twenty-two. They later left England for Jamaica, where they spent fourteen years. In Jamaica she taught at St Andrew High School in Kingston and at the UWI (University of the West Indies) in Mona, and she was also a consultant lecturer at the Jamaica College of Insurance. Persad-Bissessar also attended the University of the West Indies and the Hugh Wooding Law School in Trinidad and Tobago. She was awarded a B.A. (Hons.), a Diploma in Education, a B.A. of Laws (Hons.) and a Legal Education Certificate. In 2006 she obtained an Executive Masters in Business Administration (EMBA) from the Arthur Lok Jack Graduate School of Business, Trinidad.

Political career
In 1987 Persad-Bissessar entered politics serving as an alderwoman on the Saint Patrick County Council till 1991. She then became an opposition senator from 1994 till 1995. Persad-Bissessar then became a Member of Parliament for the Siparia constituency in 1995 and has been ever since. She served as Attorney General in 1995 until Ramesh Maharaj was able to disassociate himself from ongoing cases and again in 2001 after Maharaj left the party. When the UNC formed Government on 22 December 2000, she was sworn in as the Minister of Education.

On 25 April 2006 she received the support of the majority of Opposition MPs for the post of Leader of the Opposition. The position of Leader of the Opposition was declared vacant by President George Maxwell Richards after Basdeo Panday was convicted of failing to make an accurate declaration to the Integrity Commission concerning a bank account held in London. Persad-Bissessar was subsequently appointed Leader of the Opposition on 26 April 2006.

Political leader
On 24 January 2010, Kamla Persad-Bissessar was elected political leader of the UNC, emerging victorious over the party's founder and former Prime Minister, Basdeo Panday. She was formally appointed opposition leader on 25 February 2010, having gained the support of a majority of UNC MPs.

Prime Minister

Persad-Bissessar took office as Prime Minister after the victory of the People's Partnership in the general election of 24 May 2010, defeating the previous government of the People's National Movement, which had called an early election. Her election campaign has been analysed as a successful attempt to bring together people with different ethnic backgrounds and ideological affiliations under female leadership. She was the first female prime minister of Trinidad and Tobago and is also the first female Commonwealth Chairperson-in-Office.  She was succeeded as Chairperson-in-Office by Julia Gillard with the opening of the 2011 CHOGM on 28 October 2011.

Leader of the Opposition
On 21 September 2015, Persad-Bissessar was appointed leader of the opposition by president Anthony Carmona after her party was defeated at the polls, following the 7 September 2015 general elections. The People's National Movement led by Keith Rowley secured 23 out of 41 seats to form the government, while the People's Partnership coalition led by Persad-Bissessar secured 18 out of the 41 seats in the House of Representatives to form the opposition. In the 2020 general election, the People's National Movement won re-election and Persad-Bissessar remained the Leader of the Opposition. However, the United National Congress did pick up two more seats than previously held.

Awards

Personal life
Persad-Bissessar married Gregory Bissessar in 1971 and they have one son. She is a grandmother and also described herself as an adherent of both Hinduism and the Spiritual Baptist faith. She had raised her brother's children after he died in a car accident.

References

External links

Kamla's Karma – Anthony Milne, Trinidad Express 10 June 2002.
Biography from Nalis.

|-

|-

|-

|-

|-

1952 births
20th-century Trinidad and Tobago lawyers
Attorneys General of Trinidad and Tobago
Commonwealth Chairpersons-in-Office
Justice ministers of Trinidad and Tobago
Living people
Members of the House of Representatives (Trinidad and Tobago)
Ministers of Education of Trinidad and Tobago
People from Siparia region
Prime Ministers of Trinidad and Tobago
Recipients of Pravasi Bharatiya Samman
Trinidad and Tobago Hindus
Trinidad and Tobago politicians of Indian descent
Trinidad and Tobago women lawyers
United National Congress politicians
University of the West Indies alumni
Women government ministers of Trinidad and Tobago
Women prime ministers
Women opposition leaders